The Basilica of the National Shrine of Mary, Queen of the Universe is a basilica located in Orlando, Florida at 8300 Vineland Avenue. It was built to service the large number of Catholic tourists who visit the attractions in the Greater Orlando area. While it is a 2,000-seat church of the Diocese of Orlando and provides Mass for the faithful, it has also become a regional tourist attraction.  In 2009, it was designated as the 63rd minor basilica in the United States.  Since it is not a parish only the Sacraments of Reconciliation and the Holy Eucharist are celebrated.  No weekly bulletins are distributed.

The Shrine consists of the main church, the Rosary Garden, the Mother & Child Outdoor Chapel, the Blessed Sacrament Chapel, the Shrine Museum, and a gift shop.

History

After the grand opening of Walt Disney World in Lake Buena Vista, Florida, the Diocese of Orlando determined that the thousands of Catholics visiting from around the world needed a place to attend Mass. The Diocese arranged for Masses at several area hotels, and in the spring of 1975 Bishop Thomas Grady placed Father Fachtna Joseph Harte in charge of tourism ministry. With projections predicting over 30 million annual visitors to Greater Orlando in the 1970s, Fr. Harte and Bishop Grady worked to establish a permanent location. In 1979, property was purchased for a new facility, named under the patronage of the Virgin Mary.

On December 8, 1984, the Feast of the Immaculate Conception, enough funds had been raised to break ground for the first phase of construction. Within two years, the initial facility was completed and on November 23, 1986, the Feast of Christ the King, the first phase was blessed by Archbishop Pio Laghi, Papal Nuncio to the United States. Phase one included landscaping, a building to use as a church and offices, and a bell tower.

On August 22, 1990, the Feast of the Queenship of the Blessed Virgin Mary, ground was broken for a main church that would seat as many as 2,000 people. “We want the shrine to be a temple, a sacred place to give glory to God and honor our mother, said Bishop Norbert Dorsey. “Above all we want it to be a spiritual home, a real hearth.”

At long last, on January 31, 1993, the first Mass was celebrated in the new church.  And on August 22, 1993, the church was dedicated. Archbishop Pio Laghi was once again present. Bishop Dorsey proclaimed “a day of great rejoicing” and asked God’s grace upon all who would be drawn to the Shrine.

The use of the title "Mary, Queen of the Universe" is drawn from section 59 of Lumen gentium, the Dogmatic Constitution on the Church issued in 1964 by the Second Vatican Council, which stated: "Finally, the Immaculate Virgin, preserved free from all guilt of original sin, on the completion of her earthly sojourn, was taken up body and soul into heavenly glory, and exalted by the Lord as Queen of the universe, that she might be the more fully conformed to her Son, the Lord of lords and the conqueror of sin and death." This usage could reflect Orlando's connection to nearby Cape Canaveral, the liftoff point for America's crewed space program, as spaceflight was likely the inspiration for the term. Cape Canaveral is part of the Diocese of Orlando.

In 2004, Archbishop Thomas Wenski petitioned the USCCB to ask for the Shrine to be elevated from a diocesan to a National Shrine. The petition was granted and “National” was added to the name.

The National Conference of Catholic Bishops held their spring convocation here in 2008. On July 17, 2009, Pope Benedict XVI declared the Shrine a minor basilica because of its ministry to the estimated half million pilgrims and tourists.

Facts
 The fourteen aisle windows are entitled "The Magnificat Windows"
 It also ministers to Catholic workers at Walt Disney World and Universal Orlando Resort. 
It is the nearest Catholic church to Walt Disney World. 
 The Outdoor Chapel features a bronze sculpture of the Mother and Child by Jerzy Kenar
 The Museum displays Church art from around the world
 The Shrine contains an  sculpture featuring Mary and Baby Jesus bearing the same name "Mary, Queen of the Universe" sculpted by Jill Burkee of white marble from Carrara, Italy.
 In 2015, Bishop John Noonan designated the central door as a Holy Door as part of the celebration of the Extraordinary Jubilee of Mercy, and opened it on December 13.

Rectors of the Basilica 

 Msgr. F. Joseph Harte, 1975 - 2007
 Fr. Edward McCarthy, 2007-2011
 Fr. Paul Henry, 2011 - 2020
 Fr. Robert Webster, 2020 - 2022
 Fr. Anthony Aarons, 2022-

Gallery

References

External links

Official website

Mary, Queen of the Universe, Basilica of
Shrines to the Virgin Mary
Roman Catholic Diocese of Orlando
Roman Catholic national shrines in the United States
Churches in Orlando, Florida
Tourist attractions in Orlando, Florida
1979 establishments in Florida
20th-century Roman Catholic church buildings in the United States